The West Sussex County Division was a formation of the British Army, raised in the Second World War and formed by the redesignation of Brocforce on 9 November 1940. On 18 February 1941, the headquarters was redesignated as the Essex County Division. It was commanded by four officers, Major-General Edwin Morris from formation until 16 December, Brigadier A. E. Lawrence until 29 December, Major-General Sir Oliver Leese until 30 January 1941 and then Brigadier H. J. Parham. It was an infantry only formation consisting of two Independent Infantry Brigades. Usually, combat support, artillery, engineers etc., would be provided by other local formations, exceptionally, for a county division, the 29th Brigade Group commanded additional units.

It was commanded by XII Corps until 15 January 1941 and then by IV Corps.

Order of Battle
Both brigades were part of the division from 9 November 1940 to 17 February 1941.

29th Infantry Brigade Group
1st Battalion, Royal Scots Fusiliers
1st Battalion, Royal Welch Fusiliers
2nd Battalion, East Lancashire Regiment
2nd Battalion, South Lancashire Regiment
E Company 5th Battalion Argyll and Sutherland Highlanders (Machine guns)
29th Independent Brigade Group Anti-Tank Company
17th Field Regiment Royal Artillery
204th Anti-Tank Battery
236th Field Company Royal Engineers
29th Independent Brigade Group Company R.A.S.C.
154th Field Ambulance R.A.M.C.
29th Independent Brigade Group Provost Section R.M.P

The brigade group transferred to IV Corps after leaving the division.

201st Independent Infantry Brigade (Home)
13th Battalion, Queen's Royal Regiment (West Surrey)
14th Battalion, Queen's Royal Regiment (West Surrey)
9th Battalion, Hampshire Regiment
10th Battalion, Hampshire Regiment

The brigade transferred to the Yorkshire County Division after leaving the division.

See also

 List of British divisions in World War II

References

Bibliography

 

British county divisions
Military units and formations established in 1940
Military units and formations disestablished in 1941